The 2011–12 Delaware Fightin' Blue Hens men's basketball team represented the University of Delaware during the 2011–12 NCAA Division I men's basketball season. The Fightin' Blue Hens, led by sixth year head coach Monté Ross, played their home games at the Bob Carpenter Center and are members of the Colonial Athletic Association. They finished the season 18–14, 12–6 in CAA play to finish in fifth place in CAA play. They lost in the quarterfinals of the CAA Basketball tournament to Old Dominion. They were invited to the 2012 College Basketball Invitational where they lost in the first round to Butler.

Roster

Schedule

|-
!colspan=9| Regular season

|-
!colspan=9| 2012 CAA men's basketball tournament

|-
!colspan=12| 2012 CBI

References

Delaware Fightin' Blue Hens men's basketball seasons
Delaware
Delaware
Fight
Fight